Alfred T. B. Hunter (1850-1918) was an African-American politician and farmer from South Carolina. He was enslaved at birth in Laurens County. In 1874, he was elected to the South Carolina House of Representatives as one of four representatives from Laurens. He served on the Medical Committee and the on Committee for Roads, Bridges, and Ferries. In 1896, Hunter purchased a 65 acre farm, which his grandchildren still owned as of 1968.

See also
 African-American officeholders during and following the Reconstruction era

References

1850 births
1918 deaths
People from Laurens County, South Carolina
Farmers from South Carolina
African-American farmers
Republican Party members of the South Carolina House of Representatives
African-American state legislators in South Carolina
African-American politicians during the Reconstruction Era
20th-century African-American people